The inauguration of Luis Lacalle Pou as the 42nd president of Uruguay took place on 1 March 2020 in Montevideo and marked commencement of the term of Luis Lacalle Pou as president and Beatriz Argimón as vice president.

Events

Ceremony 
Administered by President of the Senate, José Mujica, the presidential oath was taken, before the General Assembly, in keeping with Article One Hundred and Fifty-One, Chapter 1, Section 9 of the Uruguayan Constitution. Lacalle Pou delivered a 30-minute opening speech, which was described as "short and pragmatic." It struck a tone that was liberalist. The soprano Luz del Alba Rubio sang the national anthem in E-flat major, just as Francisco José Debali conceived in 1833. The performance was accompanied by the choir of the SODRE.

After the oath, the new president and vice president paraded down along Libertador Avenue in a 1937 Ford V8 convertible that belonged to Lacalle Pou's great-grandfather, Luis Alberto de Herrera. Hundreds of horsemen from all over the country came to the capital to accompany the President's parade, which ended in Plaza Independencia.

At 4:30 p.m. in Plaza Independencia, President Lacalle Pou received the presidential sash of the outgoing president, Tabaré Vázquez, and was formally invested. There were present, several foreign leaders, legislators and other authorities, as well as the families of Lacalle Pou and Argimón. The appointed members of the Cabinet signed the Minutes Book and were invested. Subsequently, a military parade honors the President and members of the government. Likewise, President Lacalle Pou addressed the public present.

Post-ceremony events 
Later, the members of the new government entered the Estévez Palace, and the President and the First Lady along with their children greeted from the balcony, as did Vice President Beatriz Argimón, who appeared with her husband, Jorge Fernández Reyes. Afterwards, President Lacalle Pou, the First Lady, Lorena Ponce De León, and the Minister of Foreign Relations, Ernesto Talvi, greeted the guests of international delegations.

International attendees

Sovereign states

International organizations

References

External links 

 Text of Lacalle Pou's Inaugural Address

Video 

 
 

Lacalle Pou, Luis
2020 in Uruguay
Luis Alberto Lacalle Pou